Traugott Ochs (19 October 1854 – 28 August 1919) was a German court Kapellmeister, organist and conductor.

Life 
Born in Altenfeld, Ochs made his conducting debut with the Berlin Philharmonic on 24 October 1905. From 1907 to 1910, he was Kapellmeister of the Hofkapelle and conductor of the Loh-Orchester Sondershausen.

Ochs died in Berlin aged 64.

References

Further reading 
 : Traugott Ochs. Die Leitung von Hofkapelle und Konservatorium vor 100 Jahren. In Wilhelm May: Ich heiße Bahn und bin bei der Post. Gesammelte Beiträge aus der Geschichte Sondershausens. Starke, Sondershausen 2011, . (Reprint from 2007)

German classical organists
German conductors (music)
1854 births
1919 deaths
People from Ilm-Kreis